Lake Opuatia is a small lake in the much larger Opuatia wetland, which drains from the west into the Waikato River. It lies near the foot of a long valley drained by the Opuatia Stream.

Geology 
The lake is a peat lake, probably formed after Taupō pumice blocked the drainage of the valley about 1,800 years ago, when it swept down the Waikato.

History 
The lake was in an area occupied by Ngāti Karewa and Ngāti Tipa. Despite their loyalty to the Crown during the Invasion of the Waikato, their land was also confiscated in 1863.  were later returned to some members of Ngāti Tipa, though disputes about ownership continued until 1921.

By 1881,  of the route to the south of the lake had been opened as far as Glen Murray. By 1883 a through track from the Waikato River to the West Coast was in existence. Flax was a local industry for a while.

After survey pegs had been pulled up, when the Counties Act 1886 was invoked to build Opuatia Rd on Māori land, the police, with armed support, arrested 10 men and 8 women in 1894, two of whom were sentenced to two months hard labour.

The government bought  in 1895.

Roads in the valley were being metalled in the 1920s.

Schools 
Schools used to exist at Churchill, just to the east of the lake, at Orton,  to the north, and on Otuiti Rd at Opuatia. Opuatia school was open from 1917 (starting with 20 pupils) to 1973 and is now a community centre. A telephone was connected in 1919. There was also a church in the 1850s.

Wildlife

Aquatic vegetation 
The lake has not been surveyed since 1993, when four species of submerged plants were identified, including fennel leaved pondweed. Potamogeton crispus and P.pectinatus, with occasional charophytes Nitella hookeri and Chara corallina.

Fish 
Longfin eels have been recorded at the lake.

Riparian vegetation 

Weeds include gorse, reed sweet grass and reed canary grass, swamp alder, yellow flag iris,  beggarticks and royal fern. Possum and red deer are among the animal pests. Threatened species include orchids and carnivorous bladderworts.

Birds 
Canada goose, fernbirds, yellowhammer, chaffinch, riroriro, swallow, pheasant, pūkeko, mallard, harrier and shag have all been recorded in the area.

The lake has been a venue for duck shooters since at least 1921.

Restoration 
In 2000 Regional Council agreed to mitigate the effect of flood protection works near Mercer by restoring Opuatia Wetland and flooding  more frequently. Gorse and willow were sprayed with herbicide and cabbage trees, karamu, manuka, mingimingi, poataniwha, Coprosma rhamnoides, pokaka, flax, Astelia grandis, gahnia, Coprosma tenuicaulis, kahikatea and matai were planted from 2006. A further 10,000 plants have since gone in to reduce nutrients flowing from farmland to wetland.

Opuatia Stream 

There is no surface link between the lake and the stream, which flows nearby, and the lake and bog are generally fed by rainwater, except during unusually high floods, when water backs up from the Waikato.

The stream rises near Ponganui Road, about  up from the lake. Planting, fencing and goat control have been done in the  upper catchment to improve the water quality.

References

External links 

 1:50,000 map

Lakes of Waikato
Waikato District